Gary E. Clary (born January 5, 1948) is an American politician. He is a former member of the South Carolina House of Representatives from the 3rd District, serving from 2012 to 2020. He is a member of the Republican party.

References

Living people
1948 births
Republican Party members of the South Carolina House of Representatives
21st-century American politicians